Hoara Borselli (born 1976 Florence) is an Italian television personality, actress, and model.

Career 
In 1992, she took part in the Miss summer Festivalbar contest on Italia 1 .

Later, she worked as a television presenter and actress, first appearing in the film Please, strangle the stork (1995), directed by Luciano Crovato, and then, in 1997, she was in  Panarea , directed by Pipolo . Her first role as a television actress was, in 2000, that of Daniela Molinari in the soap opera Un posto al sole , broadcast on Rai 3 . Two years later she is Lei barbara Nardi Ryan for the Canale 5 soap opera, CentoVetrine . Among the other TV dramas in which she acted, the TV series Grandi Tomorrow, broadcast on Italia 1 in 2005, and the 2007 TV miniseries Provaci Ancora prof, directed by Rossella Izzo and broadcast on Rai 1 .

In 2005 she won the first edition of the Rai 1 talent show Ballando con le Stelle, paired with the maestro Simone Di Pasquale.  Between 2007 and 2008, she acted with him in the musical  theater, Saturday Night Fever.

In 2006, she co-hosted with Vincenzo Salemme in his prime time show on Rai 1, Famiglia Salemme Show . In 2008, she was the host of the variety Gabbia di matti of the Compagnia del Bagaglino broadcast on Canale 5.

In 2011, she was chosen by the former Minister of Defense Ignazio La Russa as a host and co-organizer for the celebrations of the 150th anniversary of the Unification of Italy.

From 2017 until 2018, she was radio presenter on Radio Incontro donna with Currently different , a current affairs and politics program.

References 

Italian television personalities
1976 births
Living people